The private aerospace company Blue Origin has a number of development, manufacturing, and test facilities in four US states: Washington, Texas, Florida, and Alabama.

Blue Origin began in 2000 with only a development and office facility near Seattle, Washington.  By 2003 Blue Origin was buying land in west Texas for a rocket engine test facility and, subsequently, for a suborbital rocket launch site.  
Blue Origin is currently developing a new orbital launch facility at Cape Canaveral Space Force Station and a nearby rocket assembly facility in Brevard County, Florida.

Development facility and headquarters 

, the Kent facility housed engineering, manufacturing and business operations and the majority of the 600-person Blue Origin workforce, which grew from about 350 persons at Kent in May 2015. They added an additional   of office, manufacturing and warehouse space to their headquarters facilities in 2016 and 2017.  
In late 2017, Blue Origin purchased an additional —adding to their existing —of land on which they plan to build another  of facility in Washington state.

Florida facilities 

In September 2015, Blue Origin leased Launch Complex 36 (LC-36) in Cape Canaveral, Florida to build a launch pad for their orbital launch vehicle New Glenn.  , the first Blue Origin launch from LC36 is planned for 2020. An August 2015 estimate predicted that initial launch happening earlier than 2020. Ground-breaking for the facility to begin construction occurred in June 2016. By March 2018, Blue's construction at LC-36 was lagging, but the company stated they did not think it would delay achieving the anticipated 2020 initial launch of New Glenn. However as of 2022 Blue Origin does not expect to launch New Glenn until 2023 at the earliest. The factory was complete by 2020 and was being used for the construction of New Glenn prototypes by 2021.

The Blue Origin orbital launch site will be situated on a total of 306 acres of leased land assembled from former Launch Complexes 11, 36A, and 36B.  The land parcel will be used to build a rocket engine test stand for the BE-4 engine, a launch mount—called the Orbital Launch Site by Blue—and a reusable booster refurbishment facility for the New Glenn launch vehicle, which is expected to land on a seaborne platform and returned to Port Canaveral for refurbishment.

In addition, the manufacturing of "large elements, such as first stages, second stages, payload fairings, etc." will occur at the Blue Origin launch vehicle factory on Space Commerce Parkway in nearby Exploration Park, near the entrance to the Kennedy Space Center Visitor Complex on Merritt Island.

Landing platform ship 
In October 2018, Stena Freighter, 182 meter cargo-ship purchased from ferry operator Stena Line, arrived in Florida from Spain. CEO Bob Smith, confirmed Stena Freighter would be used as the landing platform vessel for first-stage boosters. The landing ship will be hydrodynamically stabilized.

Launch Site One suborbital launch and engine test site 

Blue Origin has a suborbital launch facility known as Launch Site One. It is located in the West Texas region, 25 miles north of the town of Van Horn at 31.451646°+N, -104.762835°+W. Current launch license and experimental permits from the US government Federal Aviation Administration authorize flights of Blue Origin's New Shepard suborbital system. In addition to the suborbital launch pads, the West Texas site includes a number of rocket engine test stands.  Engine test cells to support both hydrolox, methalox and storable propellant engines are present.

Included are three test cells just for testing the methalox BE-4 engine alone: two full test cells that can support full-thrust and full-duration burns, as well as one that supports short-duration, high-pressure preburner tests, to "refine the ignition sequence and understand the start transients."

Alabama engine manufacturing facility 

In June 2016, Blue Origin president Rob Meyerson announced that they would build a new facility in Huntsville, Alabama to manufacture the large BE-4 cryogenic rocket engine.

References 

Facilities
Rocket launch sites in the United States